Erdőtarcsa is a village in Nógrád County, Hungary with 624 inhabitants (2001).

References

Populated places in Nógrád County